North Bangkok University Football Club (Thai สโมสรฟุตบอลมหาวิทยาลัยนอร์ทกรุงเทพ), is a Thailand football club under the stewardship of North Bangkok University based in Pathum Thani. The club is currently playing in the Thai League 3 Bangkok metropolitan region.

History

Their first season in the 2010 Thai Division 2 League Bangkok & field Region almost proved successful. A victory in their last game over Bangkok F.C. would have earned North Bangkok College a top two finish and a chance to enter the 2010 Regional League Division 2 playoffs. North Bangkok College were leading Bangkok F.C. 1–0 in their final game but with 15 minutes left to play, Bangkok F.C. equalized to earn a 1–1 draw and at the same time clinch top place in the league. North Bangkok College finished 5th in the table.

In 2011, the club finished as runner-up to Kasetsart in the Bangkok Division 2 and qualified for the Division 2 playoffs. The timing of the playoffs coincided with the 2011 floods so the Horsemen were forced to seek alternative home venues as theirs was flooded. It did not bode well as North Bangkok only won one game and collected six points.

In the following season, North Bangkok could not regain their 2011 form and finished 6th in the Bangkok league and season 2017 they have made the history they have won the Thai League 4.

Stadium and locations

Honours

Domestic leagues 
 Thai League 3 Bangkok Metropolitan Region
 Winners (3): 2020–21, 2021–22, 2022–23
 Thai League 4 Bangkok Metropolitan Region
 Winners (2): 2017, 2018

Season by season record

Current squad

Club officials

External links
Official Website
Official Facebookpage

Association football clubs established in 2006
Football clubs in Thailand
Sport in Bangkok
2006 establishments in Thailand
University and college association football clubs